The Else Kröner-Fresenius Foundation (Else Kröner-Fresenius-Stiftung in German, or EKFS), founded in 1983, is a non-profit foundation dedicated to the support of medical research and medical-humanitarian development projects.

History 
Else Kröner (born in Fernau, 1925–1988) took over The Fresenius Company in 1946 after the death of her mentor and foster father Eduard Fresenius. Kröner led the company until her death in 1988, first as managing director and from 1982 as chair of the board.

To provide continuity in the event of her death and to cultivate the memory of Eduard Fresenius, Else Kröner founded the Else Kröner-Fresenius-Foundation on 7 April 1983. Initially the foundation was provided with a capital stock of 50,000 deutschmarks. Kröner decreed that in the event of her death all her personal assets should be transferred to the foundation.

On 5 June 1988, Else Kröner died unexpectedly, at the age of 63 years.

Purpose of the Foundation 
In her will, Else Kröner laid out the foundation's purpose:The Foundation aims to promote medical science, giving priority to the areas of research and the treatment of diseases, including the development of equipment and preparations, such as artificial kidneys . The foundation may support only those research projects whose results are accessible to the general public. The foundation also aims to promote the training of medical professionals, primarily in the field of dialysis, and the promotion of education of especially talented students.

Activities 
The main focus of the Else Kröner-Fresenius Foundation is financing clinically-oriented biomedical research. Research proposals from all fields of medicine are considered. As of 2016, roughly 1300 projects have been funded, totaling over 200 million euros. It is one of the largest private foundations in Germany.

Else Kröner Memorial scholarships 
In 2002, the Foundation awarded the first of two scholarships. Due to high demand and the high quality of applications since 2007, the foundation has awarded five scholarships every year.

Science awards 
The Foundation grants or supports various scientific prizes, including the Else Kröner-Fresenius Immunology Award and the Else Kröner Memorial Award of the German Interdisciplinary Association for Intensive and Emergency Medicine.

Winner of the first-ever Else Kröner-Fresenius Award in Immunology was Ruslan Medzhitov, in 2013. This prize is handed out every four years and is worth 4 million euros, 500,000 of which goes directly to the researcher, with the remainder being project-directed.

Educational initiatives 
The Else Kröner-Fresenius Centre for Nutritional Medicine was founded in 2003 at the Technical University of Munich.

The Graduate School for "Translational Research Innovation – Pharma" (TRIP) was founded by the EKFS at the Goethe-University Frankfurt in 2012.

See also
 List of wealthiest charitable foundations

References

External links
 

Medical and health organisations based in Hesse
Bad Homburg vor der Höhe
Biomedical research foundations
German medical research